Nicolae Gaiduc (born 23 July 1996) is a cross-country skier competing for his homeland of Moldova at the 2018 Winter Olympics. He served as his nation's flag-bearer at the 2018 Winter Olympics Parade of Nations.

References 

1996 births
Living people
Moldovan male cross-country skiers
Cross-country skiers at the 2018 Winter Olympics
Olympic cross-country skiers of Moldova